Nach to the Groove is an Indian television show that taught dance steps to the viewers.

Disney Channel launched 'Nach to the Groove' as an initiative to engage the tween audiences in dance and song. The kids channelroped in Kabir Arora to teach the audience 'How to Groove' on High School Musical and various Bollywood hits. Bollywood choreographer, Shiamak Davar set the mood for the groove at the start of each segment.

Format
The show started with Shiamak Davar choosing songs from High School Musical series, or Bollywood, and the taking a sentence from that song and showing steps suitable for that song's paragraph. The kids on the set with Kabir Arora practised that steps and teaching it to the viewers also.

References
http://www.indiantelevision.com/headlines/y2k8/mar/mar290.php

Hindi-language television shows
Indian dance television shows
Disney Channel (Indian TV channel) original programming
2008 Indian television series debuts
2008 Indian television series endings